Ali Sowe (born 14 June 1994) is a Gambian professional footballer who plays as a forward for Turkish club Ankaragücü, on loan from Russian club Rostov, and the Gambia national team.

Club career

Early years
Ali was made under contract in early 2013 by Chievo from Gambian club GAMTEL FC after he was already capped for the Gambia national football team despite his very young age. He joined "Primavera" side for the Veronese club. After collecting two caps, on 18 July 2013, he was loaned to Juve Stabia alongside his Senegalese teammate N'Diaye Djiby, playing in the 2013–14 Serie B.

Skënderbeu
On 25 July 2017, Skënderbeu reached an agreement with Chievo for the loan of Sowe for 2017–18 season. The transfer was made official six days later, where he signed the contract and was assigned squad number 90.

He made his Skënderbeu debut on 17 August by starting in the first leg of 2017–18 UEFA Europa League play-off round against Dinamo Zagreb which finished in a 1–1 draw. In the second leg, the team held off and earned a goalless draw, with Sowe giving a strong performance, meaning that they have qualified to group stage for the second time in history, also becoming first Albanian club to successfully pass four rounds.

Sowe started the domestic season on 6 September by scoring a brace in the Albanian Cup first round 8–0 hammering of Adriatiku. His league debut occurred three days later in the opening day of 2017–18 Kategoria Superiore season against Flamurtari. He endured 244 minutes before netting his first goal in league, which came on 23 September in the matchday 3 against Partizani, helping Skënderbeu to their first win in six matches against Red Bulls. Sowe scored his first Europa League group stage goal five days later in the match against Young Boys.

He was named Albanian Superliga Player of the Month in October 2017. Sowe's second Europa League group stage goal came later on 23 November in the 3–2 win against Dynamo Kyiv which was their second ever group stage win. He concluded the first part of the season by netting a brace in the 3–1 home win over Teuta.

Sowe scored his first career hat-trick on 9 May 2018 in Skënderbeu's 4–2 away defeat of bottom side Lushnja; this win clinched the championship for the club with three games to spare. He finished the league by winning the Golden Boot, netting 21 goals in 33 games, beating out his rival Sindrit Guri.

CSKA Sofia 

On 5 September 2018, Sowe was loaned to Bulgarian club CSKA Sofia until the end of the season. On 31 January 2019, the transfer was made permanent, after CSKA activated his buyout clause. On 1 July 2020, he was the only player to miss from the spot in the 2020 Bulgarian Cup Final, with CSKA Sofia's opponents Lokomotiv Plovdiv lifting the trophy. On 10 December 2020, Sowe scored a brace in the 3–1 win over Roma in a UEFA Europa League match, though CSKA Sofia had already been eliminated from the tournament and finished in last place  in their group. He established himself as the main forward for the team and became the foreign player with the most goals for CSKA Sofia in all tournaments, including solely in the league.

Rostov 
On 16 February 2021, Sowe moved to Russian Premier League side Rostov, on a loan deal with an option to buy. On his league debut for Rostov on 27 February 2021, he scored twice to secure a 2–2 away draw against the defending champions FC Zenit Saint Petersburg.

On 10 June 2021, Rostov exercised their purchase option in the loan contract and Sowe signed a four-year contract with the club.

Loan to Ankaragücü
On 14 July 2022, Sowe joined Ankaragücü in Turkey on a season-long loan.

International career
Sowe earned his first cap for Gambia on 10 August 2011, in the 3–0 win over DR Congo in a friendly match.

Career statistics

Club

International

Honours
Skënderbeu
Kategoria Superiore: 2017–18

CSKA Sofia
 Bulgarian Cup: 2020–21

Individual
Albanian Superliga Player of the Month: October 2017
Albanian Superliga top goalscorer: 2017–18

References

External links
 

1994 births
Living people
Sportspeople from Banjul
Gambian footballers
Association football forwards
Gamtel FC players
A.C. ChievoVerona players
S.S. Juve Stabia players
Delfino Pescara 1936 players
Latina Calcio 1932 players
U.S. Lecce players
Modena F.C. players
A.C. Prato players
KF Skënderbeu Korçë players
PFC CSKA Sofia players
FC Rostov players
MKE Ankaragücü footballers
Serie A players
Serie B players
Serie C players
Kategoria Superiore players
First Professional Football League (Bulgaria) players
Russian Premier League players
Süper Lig players
The Gambia international footballers
Gambian expatriate footballers
Expatriate footballers in Italy
Gambian expatriate sportspeople in Italy
Expatriate footballers in Bulgaria
Gambian expatriate sportspeople in Bulgaria
Expatriate footballers in Russia
Gambian expatriate sportspeople in Russia
Expatriate footballers in Turkey
Gambian expatriate sportspeople in Turkey